Martín Ignacio Ferreyra (born 2 April 1996) is an Argentine professional footballer who plays as a defender for Olimpo.

Career
Ferreyra began with Olimpo. He made his professional debut in the Primera División on 12 May 2018, featuring for the final thirteen minutes of the club's 2–2 home draw with Talleres; in what was his only appearance in 2017–18, which Olimpo ended with relegation. His first start arrived in their subsequent Primera B Nacional away opener against Brown in September 2018, with the defender receiving a straight red card in 3–0 loss. In the preceding July, Ferreyra scored his first goal in senior football against Aldosivi in the Copa Argentina.

Career statistics
.

References

External links

1996 births
Living people
Sportspeople from Bahía Blanca
Argentine footballers
Association football defenders
Argentine Primera División players
Primera Nacional players
Olimpo footballers